By-elections were held in Myanmar on 3 November 2018 to fill 13 parliamentary seats: one in the Amyotha Hluttaw, four in the Pyithu Hluttaw, and eight in the State and Regional Hluttaw. The seats were left vacant due to the resignation or death of incumbent Members of Parliament.

Results

House of Nationalities

House of Representatives

State/Region Hluttaw

Results by Constituency

References 

By-elections in Myanmar
Myanmar
By-elections